Farm to Market Road 1938 (FM 1938) is a Farm to Market Road in the US state of Texas. The highway runs from State Highway 26 (SH 26) to FM 1709, in Tarrant County. While located in Westlake, FM 1938 is named Precinct Line Road. While located in Southlake, from the northern border of Southlake to its junction with FM 1709, FM 1938 is named Randol Mill Avenue, and from the FM 1709 intersection to its southern terminus, the highway is named Davis Boulevard. FM 1938 was designated in 1952, in Hockley County, but was cancelled and redesignated in 1955, at its modern location in Tarrant County. In 1995, the entire route of FM 1938 was redesignated as Urban Road 1938 (UR 1938) by the Texas Department of Transportation (TxDOT). FM 1938 passes through central North Richland Hills and Southlake, providing access to several businesses. As of 2012, FM 1938 is in the process of being extended from an intersection with FM 1709 to the north frontage road of SH 114.

Route description

FM 1938 (Davis Boulevard) begins at its southern terminus with SH 26, directly besides the raised Interstate 820 (I-820) freeway. FM 1938 continues on for about  before two exit ramps coming from I-820 merge with it, giving incomplete access to the freeway. The highway proceeds as a paved, asphalt, six-lane highway, with a center left-turn lane dividing it. The road continues through "downtown North Richland Hills", passing several small businesses and large residential neighborhoods. Along this stretch, FM 1938 is traveling due north. After an intersection with Smithfield Road, the highway turns in a northeastern direction and heads that way. It continues through North Richland Hills, intersecting with several large roads and passing a set of railroad tracks. The highway heads north for about 5.5 miles before intersecting with FM 3029 and entering the city of Keller. The highway proceeds through Keller, passing several small businesses and large neighborhoods. FM 1938 passes through Keller for about  before passing over a small creek and entering the city of Southlake. Just after entering Southlake, the highway passes a large landscaping and stone supplies facility.

Continuation
On August 23, 2007, TxDOT authorized an extension of FM 1938 from the intersection with FM 1709 to the northern frontage road of SH 114. This is in order to connect the current length of Randol Mill Road to SH 114.

History
On January 18, 1952, FM 1938 was designated in Hockley County, traveling from an intersection with FM 1490 to an intersection with Hockley County Road 237 (now FM 303). On November 1, 1954, FM 1938 was cancelled and combined with FM 597 when it was extended. On June 27, 1995, the entire route was redesignated as Urban Road 1938, although, like other routes like this, the signage did not change. The extension to SH 114 opened in August 2012 but construction on the Randol Mill Avenue section of the extension in addition to landscaping and sidewalk work on the whole extension is ongoing. On November 15, 2018, Urban Road 1938 was redesignated as FM 1938

Major junctions

See also

References

1938
Transportation in Tarrant County, Texas
North Richland Hills, Texas